WYGN-LD, virtual and VHF digital channel 10, is a low-powered 3ABN-affiliated television station licensed to Berrien Springs, Michigan, United States. The station is owned by Good News Television.

History

WYGN originally signed on July 22, 1988 in South Bend, Indiana as W12BK on channel 12, a low-power repeater of WCIU-TV, the former Telemundo affiliate which became a Univision affiliate in 1989, and then became an English-language Independent station in Chicago, Illinois at the end of 1994. It would switch to being a low-power repeater of WBND-LP, the ABC affiliate in South Bend on May 26, 1996, and that the license would move to Berrien Springs, Michigan that same year. On March 14, 2002, the station was transferred to its current owner, Good News Television, who had previously been broadcasting 3ABN programming on the now-WCWW-LD channel 25 in South Bend.

One of the board members of Good News Television, Dr. Robert Moon, is also the treasurer of the Raymond S. and Dorothy N. Moore Foundation, which owns another 3ABN affiliate, W07CL.

In January 2007, WYGN-LP was granted a construction permit for a digital companion channel on Channel 10. The FCC granted a license to operate on Channel 10 on July 1, 2009.

Digital television
The station's digital signal is multiplexed:

References

External links

YGN-LD
Three Angels Broadcasting Network
Low-power television stations in the United States
Television channels and stations established in 1988
1988 establishments in Indiana